Luke Gardiner (c. 1690 – 25 September 1755) was an Irish property developer and politician.

In the Irish House of Commons he represented Tralee from 1725 until 1727 and Thomastown from 1727 until his death in 1755. He was appointed to the Irish Privy Council on 2 August 1737.

In 1711 he married Anne Stewart, daughter of the Hon. Alexander Stewart and heiress in her issue to the estates of the Viscounts Mountjoy. Their son Charles also served as an MP and Privy Counsellor.

During his career Gardiner acquired a wide variety of properties throughout Dublin city.  The major continuous part, much of which he purchased from the Moore family in 1714, was a large piece of land to the East of the then established city.  This estate corresponds to the modern area bounded by The Royal Canal, Dorset Street, the Western Way, Constitution Hill, Parnell Street, O'Connell Street and the River Liffey.  As owner of this land, Gardiner led the development of the Northside of the city east along the river, developing what is now O'Connell Street (then Sackville Street), Dorset Street, Parnell Street and Square (then Rutland Street & Square), and Mountjoy Square.  After his death, his son and heir Charles continued the development, finishing Rutland Square before his grandson, Luke Gardiner (later Lord and Viscount Mountjoy) inherited the estate and accelerated the development further East.

References

1755 deaths
Irish MPs 1715–1727
Irish MPs 1727–1760
Members of the Privy Council of Ireland
Year of birth uncertain
Members of the Parliament of Ireland (pre-1801) for County Kerry constituencies
Members of the Parliament of Ireland (pre-1801) for County Kilkenny constituencies
Irish businesspeople in real estate